Sindris is a genus of snout moths.

Species
Some species of this genus are:

Sindris bipunctalis 	Hampson, 1906
Sindris cervinalis 	Hampson, 1896
Sindris deltoidalis 	Hampson, 1906
Sindris holochralis 	Hampson, 1906
Sindris leucomelas 	Kenrick, 1917
Sindris magnifica 	Jordan, 1904
Sindris rogueti 	Leraut, 2013
Sindris sganzini 	Boisduval, 1833

References

Pyralinae
Pyralidae genera